Zeleni Vir Hydroelectric Power Plant is a hydroelectric power plant located near the town of Skrad, Gorski Kotar region in Croatia.

The Zeleni Vir Hydroelectric Power Plant is a high-pressure diversion plant that harnesses the water power of the Curak Brook with head of about 50 m. It was built in 1921.

It is operated by Hrvatska elektroprivreda.

The Kupa River catchment hydroelectric power plants 
Ozalj Hydroelectric Power Plant
Gojak Hydroelectric Power Plant
Lešće Hydroelectric Power Plant
Zeleni Vir Hydroelectric Power Plant
Zoomba Hydroelectric Power Plant

See also 

Skrad

References

Hydroelectric power stations in Croatia
Buildings and structures in Primorje-Gorski Kotar County